Drydock Number One is the oldest operational drydock facility in the United States. Located in Norfolk Naval Shipyard in Portsmouth, Virginia, it was put into service in 1834, and has been in service since then. It was declared a National Historic Landmark in 1971.

Description and history
Drydock Number One is located on the west side of the central branch of the Elizabeth River. It measures  in length, and is built of Massachusetts granite, stepped to allow access to and bracing of ships under repair. Stairs at the land end provide access to the various levels.

The drydock was built between 1827 and 1834, and cost $974,365.65, a very high price at that time.  It may have been designed by Loammi Baldwin, Jr., then the Navy's superintendent of drydocks, and its construction was overseen by William P. S. Sanger, a civil engineer.  The drydock was first used in June 1833, when  was drydocked for recommissioning, the first time a large vessel was drydocked in the United States.

During the opening phase of the American Civil War in April 1861, Union forces were dispatched from Washington on the USS Pawnee to assist in destroying military assets as the shipyard was being abandoned; however, efforts to blow-up the dry dock were unsuccessful. The shipyard was then taken over by the Confederate Navy, which was a severe blow to the Union, and it was here that  was modified to become the ironclad . 

Today, Drydock Number One is still in operation, used primarily to service U.S. Navy vessels.

See also
 List of U.S. National Historic Landmark ships, shipwrecks, and shipyards
 List of National Historic Landmarks in Virginia
 National Register of Historic Places listings in Portsmouth, Virginia

References

National Historic Landmarks in Virginia
Buildings and structures in Portsmouth, Virginia
1827 establishments in Virginia
Industrial buildings and structures on the National Register of Historic Places in Virginia
Water transportation buildings and structures on the National Register of Historic Places
Transportation buildings and structures on the National Register of Historic Places in Virginia
National Register of Historic Places in Portsmouth, Virginia
Drydocks
United States Navy shipyards
Historic Civil Engineering Landmarks